The electron electric dipole moment  is an intrinsic property of an electron such that the potential energy is linearly related to the strength of the electric field: 

The electron's electric dipole moment (EDM) must be collinear with the direction of the electron's magnetic moment (spin). Within the Standard Model of elementary particle physics, such a dipole is predicted to be non-zero but very small, at most , where e stands for the elementary charge. The discovery of a substantially larger electron electric dipole moment would imply a violation of both parity invariance and time reversal invariance.

Implications for Standard Model and extensions
In the Standard Model, the electron EDM arises from the CP-violating components of the CKM matrix. The moment is very small because the CP violation involves quarks, not electrons directly, so it can only arise by quantum processes where virtual quarks are created, interact with the electron, and then are annihilated.

If neutrinos are Majorana particles, a larger EDM (around ) is possible in the Standard Model.

Many extensions to the Standard Model have been proposed in the past two decades. These extensions generally predict larger values for the electron EDM. For instance, the various technicolor models predict  that ranges from 10−27 to 10−29 e⋅cm. Some supersymmetric models predict that  but some other parameter choices or other supersymmetric models lead to smaller predicted values. The present experimental limit therefore eliminates some of these technicolor/supersymmetric theories, but not all. Further improvements, or a positive result, would place further limits on which theory takes precedence.

Formal definition 
As the electron has a net charge, the definition of its electric dipole moment is ambiguous in that 

depends on the point  about which the moment of the charge distribution  is taken.  If we were to choose  to be the center of charge, then  would be identically zero.
A more interesting choice would be to take  as the electron's center of mass evaluated in the frame in which the electron is at rest.

Classical notions such as the center of charge and mass are, however, hard to make precise for a quantum elementary particle. In practice the definition used by experimentalists comes from the form factors  appearing in the matrix element 
 
of the electromagnetic current operator between two on-shell states with Lorentz invariant phase space normalization in which 
 
The  form factor  is the electron's charge,   is its static magnetic dipole moment, and  provides the formal definition of the electron's electric dipole moment.
The remaining form factor  would, if nonzero, be the anapole moment.

Experimental measurements 
Electron EDMs are usually not measured on free electrons, but instead on bound, unpaired valence electrons inside atoms and molecules. The sensitivity to  scales approximately with the nuclear charge cubed. For this reason, electron EDM searches almost always are conducted on systems involving heavy elements.

To date, no experiment has found a non-zero electron EDM. Here is a list of some electron EDM experiments after 2000 with published results:

The ACME collaboration is, as of 2020, developing a further version of the ACME experiment series. The latest experiment is called Advanced ACME or ACME III and it aims to improve the limit on electron EDM by one to two orders of magnitude.

Future proposed experiments 
Besides the above groups, electron EDM experiments are being pursued or proposed by the following groups:

 University of Groningen: BaF molecular beam
 John Doyle (Harvard University), Nicholas Hutzler (California Institute of Technology), and Timothy Steimle (Arizona State University): YbOH molecular trap
 Amar Vutha (University of Toronto), Eric Hessels (York University): oriented polar molecules in an inert gas matrix
 Pennsylvania State University: Cs and Rb atoms trapped inside an optical lattice
 TRIUMF: Fountain of laser cooled Fr
 EDMMA collaboration: Cs in an inert gas matrix

See also
 Neutron electric dipole moment
 Electron magnetic moment

 CP violation
 Charge conjugation 
 T-symmetry
 Anomalous electric dipole moment

Footnotes

References

Electric dipole moment
Electromagnetism
Particle physics